Strumigenys hispida is a species of yellow ant up to 3 mm in length. It is endemic to Taiwan.

This ant is very similar to Strumigenys solifontis but there are several distinguishing features including much more prominent lamellae on the propodeum, and thorax with a flatter upper profile.

References

Myrmicinae
Insects described in 1996
Endemic fauna of Taiwan
Insects of Taiwan
Hymenoptera of Asia